Albert David Reid, MC (25 July 1886 – 22 May 1962) was an Australian politician. Born in Murrumburrah, New South Wales, he was educated at state schools before becoming a farmer and grazier at Crowther. He sat on Murrumburrah Shire Council before serving in the military in 1914. He was awarded the Military Cross for gallantry at Beersheeba in October 1917.

In 1927, he was elected to the New South Wales Legislative Assembly as the Country Party member for Young. He was defeated in 1930 but re-elected in 1932. He was Minister for Agriculture 1938–1941. He was defeated at the 1941 state election by 660 votes. He served with the Australian forces during World War II from 1941 to 1943. In 1949, he was elected to the Australian Senate as a Country Party Senator for New South Wales. He retired in 1961, with the retirement to take effect in 1962, but died while still a Senator; no appointment was made.

References

1886 births
1962 deaths
National Party of Australia members of the Parliament of Australia
Members of the Australian Senate for New South Wales
Members of the Australian Senate
Australian recipients of the Military Cross
20th-century Australian politicians
Members of the New South Wales Legislative Council